This is a list of planning areas in Hong Kong.

Hong Kong Planning Areas (HPA)
Kennedy Town and Mount Davis (HPA 1)
Sai Ying Pun and Sheung Wan (HPA 3)
Central District (HPA 4)
Wan Chai (HPA 5)
Causeway Bay (HPA 6)
Wong Nai Chung (HPA 7)
North Point (HPA 8)
Shau Kei Wan (HPA 9)
Pok Fu Lam (HPA 10)
Mid-Levels West (HPA 11)
Mid-Levels East (HPA 12)
Jardine's Lookout and Wong Nai Chung Gap (HPA 13)
The Peak Area (HPA 14)
Aberdeen and Ap Lei Chau (HPA 15 and 16)
Shouson Hill and Repulse Bay (HPA 17, Violet Hill not in outline zoning plan)
Tai Tam and Shek O (HPA 18)
Stanley (HPA 19)
Chai Wan (HPA 20)
Quarry Bay (HPA 21)
(Mount Butler) (HPA 23, not in outline zoning plan)
Central District (Extension) (HPA 24)
Wan Chai North (HPA 25)

Kowloon Planning Areas (KPA)
Tsim Sha Tsui (KPA 1)
Yau Ma Tei (KPA 2)
Mong Kok (KPA 3)
Shek Kip Mei (KPA 4)
Cheung Sha Wan (KPA 5)
Ho Man Tin (KPA 6 and 7)
Wang Tau Hom and Tung Tau (KPA 8)
Hung Hom (KPA 9)
Ma Tau Kok (KPA 10)
Tsz Wan Shan, Diamond Hill and San Po Kong (KPA 11)
Ngau Chi Wan (KPA 12)
Ngau Tau Kok and Kowloon Bay (KPA 13 and 17)
Kwun Tong North (KPA 14N)
Kwun Tong South (KPA 14S)
Cha Kwo Ling, Yau Tong and Lei Yue Mun (KPA 15)
Lai Chi Kok (KPA 16)
Kowloon Tong (KPA 18)
South West Kowloon (KPA 20)
Kai Tak (KPA 22)

Note: Although Stonecutters Island is within Kowloon, it belongs to New Territories planning areas.

New Territories
Tsuen Wan (TW)
Tsuen Wan West (TWW)
Kwai Chung (KC)
Tsing Yi (TY)
Stonecutters Island (SC)
Tuen Mun (TM)
Yuen Long (YL)
Tin Shui Wai (TSW)
Sha Tin (ST)
Ma On Shan (MOS)
Pak Shek Kok (East) (PSK)
Tai Po (TP)
Fanling / Sheung Shui (FSS)
Tseung Kwan O (TKO)
South Lantau Coast (SLC)
So Kwun Wat (TM-SKW)
Lam Tei and Yick Yuen (TM-LTYY)
Ping Shan (YL-PS)
Tong Yan San Tsuen (YL-TYST)
Ha Tsuen ( (YL-HT)
Sheung Pak Nai and Ha Pak Nai (YL-PN)
Lau Fau Shan and Tsim Bei Tsui (YL-LFS)
Tai Tong (YL-TT)
Nam Sang Wai (YL-NSW)
Mai Po and Fairview Park(YL-MP)
Kam Tin South (YL-KTS)
Kam Tin North (YL-KTN)
Shek Kong (YL-SK)
Pat Heung (YL-PH)
Ngau Tam Mei (YL-NTM)
San Tin (YL-ST)
Kwu Tung North (NE-KTN)
Kwu Tung South (NE-KTS)
Ping Kong (NE-PK)
Fu Tei Au and Sha Ling (NE-FTA)
Hung Lung Hang (NE-HLH)
Ping Che and Ta Kwu Ling (NE-TKL)
Wo Keng Shan (NE-WKS)
Luk Keng and Wo Hang (NE-LK)
Man Uk Pin (NE-MUP)
Hok Tau (NE-HT)
Lung Yeuk Tau and Kwan Tei South (NE-LYT)
Kau Lung Hang (NE-KLH)
Lam Tsuen (NE-LT)
Sha Lo Tung (NE-SLT)
Ting Kok (NE-TK)
Wu Kau Tang (NE-WKT)
Shap Sze Heung (NE-SSH)
Tai Mong Tsai and Tsam Chuk Wan (SK-TMT)
Tai Long Wan (SK-TLW)
Pak Kong and Sha Kok Mei (SK-PK)
Sai Kung Town (SK-SKT)
Hebe Haven (SK-HH)
Ho Chung (SK-HC)
Kwun Yam Shan and Fa Sam Hang (ST-KYS)
Tseng Lan Shue (SK-TLS)
Clear Water Bay Peninsula North (SK-CWBN)
Clear Water Bay Peninsula South (SK-CWBS)
Tung A and Pak A (under Development Permission Area Plans)
Sham Chung (under Development Permission Area Plans)
Pak Lap (under Development Permission Area Plans)
Tai Long Sai Wan (under Development Permission Area Plans)
Chek Keng (under Development Permission Area Plans)
Hoi Ha (under Development Permission Area Plans)
Ko Lau Wan (under Development Permission Area Plans)
Lai Chi Wo, Siu Tan and Sam A Tsuen (under Development Permission Area Plans)
Lin Ma Hang (under Development Permission Area Plans)
Man Kam To (under Development Permission Area Plans)
Ma Tso Lung and Hoo Hok Wai (under Development Permission Area Plans)
So Lo Pun (under Development Permission Area Plans)
Sha Tau Lok (under Development Permission Area Plans)
Ta Kwu Ling North (under Development Permission Area Plans)
To Kwa Peng and Pak Tam Au (under Development Permission Area Plans)
Yung Shue O (under Development Permission Area Plans)
Yim Tin Tsai and Ma Shi Chau (under Development Permission Area Plans)
Mau Ping (under Development Permission Area Plans)
Tin Fu Tsai (under Development Permission Area Plans)

Islands
Tung Chung Town Centre Area (I-TCTC)
North-East Lantau (I-NEL)
Ma Wan (I-MWI)
Chek Lap Kok (I-CLK)
Discovery Bay (I-DB)
Lamma Island (I-LI)
Peng Chau (I-PC)
Cheung Chau (I-CC)
Luk Wu and Keung Shan (under Development Permission Area Plans)
Po Toi Islands (under Development Permission Area Plans)
Tai O Fringe (under Development Permission Area Plans)
Mui Wo Fringe (I-MWF)
Ngong Ping (I-NP)

External links
Map of Statutory Plans
Schedule of Statutory Plans
Statutory Planning Portal
Coverage of Statutory Plans
Planning areas in the urban areas of Hong Kong and eastern part of New Territories

Geography of Hong Kong
Hong Kong geography-related lists